Rakotule is a village in the Republic of Croatia, part of the Municipality of Karojba, Istria County.

In the 2011 census, the settlement had 226 inhabitants.

References

Populated places in Istria County